John or Johnny Power may refer to:

Arts and entertainment
John Power (director) (1930–2016), Australian television and film director
John Power (musician) (born 1967), English singer-songwriter and musician
John Joseph Wardell Power (1881–1943; aka J. W. Power), Australian modernist artist

Politics and government
John Power (Irish MP), Member of Parliament for County Waterford and Dungarvon
John Power (Patriot Parliament MP), Member of Irish Parliament for Charleville
John Joseph Power (1867–1968), Australian politician
John O'Connor Power (1846–1919), Irish Fenian
Sir John Power, 1st Baronet (1874–1945), British Member of Parliament for Wimbledon
Sir John Talbot Power, 3rd Baronet, Member of Parliament for County Wexford

Sports
John Power (cricketer) (1932–2005), Australian cricketer
John Power (footballer), English football goalkeeper
John Power (Carrickshock hurler) (born 1992), Irish hurler
John Power (John Locke's hurler) (born 1966), former Irish sportsperson
John A. Power (born 1976), rugby league player
John T. Power (1883–1982), Irish hurler
Johnny Power (1874–1958), Australian rules footballer

Other
John Power, a maker of Irish whiskey in the early 1800s, part of the family history of the Powers brand
John Power, character in The Abduction Club
John Power (hunger striker) (1900-1953), Irish revolutionary, hunger striker, and shopkeeper
John Power (Master of Pembroke College, Cambridge) (1819–1880)
John Power (Vicar-General for New York) (1792–1849), Irish-born American Catholic priest
John Arthur Power, English physician, lecturer in medicine, and amateur entomologist
John Carroll Power (1819–1894), American historian and custodian of the tomb of Abraham Lincoln
John Hyacinth Power (1884–1964), director of the McGregor Museum in Kimberley, South Africa
John V. Power (1918–1944), United States Marine Corps first lieutenant
John Wyse Power (1859–1926), Irish journalist, newspaper editor and Irish nationalist

See also 
Jack Power (disambiguation)
Jackie Power (1916–1994), Irish hurler and Gaelic football player
Johnny Powers (disambiguation)
John Powers (disambiguation)
Jack Powers (1827–1860), Irish-American gambler and gang leader
Jon Powers (born 1978), American political activist
Jonathon Power (born 1974), Canadian squash player